By-elections to the 6th Canadian Parliament were held to elect members of the House of Commons of Canada between the 1887 federal election and the 1891 federal election. The Conservative Party of Canada led a majority government for the 6th Canadian Parliament.

The list includes Ministerial by-elections which occurred due to the requirement that Members of Parliament recontest their seats upon being appointed to Cabinet. These by-elections were almost always uncontested. This requirement was abolished in 1931.

See also
List of federal by-elections in Canada

Sources
 Parliament of Canada–Elected in By-Elections 

1890 elections in Canada
1889 elections in Canada
1888 elections in Canada
1887 elections in Canada
06th